The Lowland Clearances were one of the results of the Scottish Agricultural Revolution, which changed the traditional system of agriculture which had existed in Lowland Scotland in the seventeenth century. Thousands of cottars and tenant farmers from the southern counties (Lowlands) of Scotland migrated from farms and small holdings they had occupied to the new industrial centres of Glasgow, Edinburgh and northern England  or abroad, or remaining upon land though adapting to the Scottish Agricultural Revolution.

History

As farmland became more commercialised in Scotland during the 18th century, land was often rented through auctions. This led to an inflation of rents that priced many tenants out of the market.  Furthermore, changes in agricultural practice meant the replacement of part-time labourer or subtenants (known as cottars, cottagers, or bondsmen) with full-time agricultural labourers who lived either on the main farm or in rented accommodation in growing or newly founded villages. This led many contemporary writers and modern historians to associate the Agricultural Revolution with the disappearance of cottars and their way of life from many parts of the southern Scotland.

Many small settlements were torn down, their occupants forced either to the new purpose-built villages built by the landowners such as John Cockburn of Ormiston to house the displaced cottars on the outskirts of the new ranch-style farms, or to the new industrial centres of Glasgow, Edinburgh or northern England. In other areas, such as the southwest, landowners offered low rents and nearby employment to tenants they deemed to be respectable. Between 1760 and 1830, many tens of thousands of Lowland Scots emigrated mainly within Lowland Scotland, with some taking advantage of the many new opportunities offered in Canada to own and farm their own land. Most chose to remain, by choice, some out of an inability to secure transatlantic passage, or because of obligations in Scotland.

Notes

See also
Highland Clearances

References

Further reading 
 Aitchison, Pete and Cassell, Andrew. The Lowland Clearances, Scotland's Silent Revolution: 1760–1830, 2003
 
 Devine, T. M.   Scottish Nation: 1700–2000, 2001
 Gibson, Alex,  1990. ‘Proletarianization? The Transition to Full-Time Labour on a Scottish Estate, 1723–1787’. Continuity and Change, 5 (3): 357–89.
 Orr, Alistair, 1984. ‘Farm Servants and Farm Labour in the Forth Valley and South-East Lowlands’. In Farm Servants and Labour in Lowland Scotland, 1770–1914.

External links 
 BBC Radio Scotland series
 Scotland's Forgotten Clearances

Forced migration
Scottish emigration
Scottish diaspora
Enclosures
18th century in Scotland
19th century in Scotland
History of agriculture in Scotland
Scottish Lowlands